The Battle of Choloki took place on 4 June 1854 on the outskirts of village Kakuti in Guria during the Crimean war. 

After being defeated in the battle of Nigoiti Ottomans retreated to Ozurgeti in order to regroup. Russo-Georgian detachments, under the command of Ivane Andronikashvili, advanced at a steady and fast pace. Ottomans were located in the left bank of Choloki river. The Gurian posse was the first to suddenly assault Ottomans, after that Georgians shelled from artillery and started decisive offensive attack. As the Ottomans were forced to flee their plans to enter in Samtskhe–Javakheti were collapsed.

Sources 
 G. Narsia, Georgian Soviet Encyclopedia, XI, p. 146–147, Tbilisi, 1987
 Allen W. E. D., Muratoff P. P. Caucasian Battlefields: A History of the Wars on the Turco-Caucasian Border. 1828—1921 

Choloki
Choloki
Choloki
19th century in Georgia (country)
1854 in the Ottoman Empire
Choloki